Gemeinde (plural: Gemeinden) is a German word translating to "community", "town", "parish", or "municipality".

Gemeinde may refer to:
 An administrative division encompassing a single village, town, or city:
 Gemeinde (Austria)
 Gemeinde (Germany)
 Gemeinde (South Tyrol)
 Gemeinde (Switzerland)
 Gemeinde (theology), a Christian or Jewish congregation

See also
 Gemeente, in the Netherlands
 Gmina, in Poland